Sushma Krishnamurthy Rao (Born 23 February 1985) is an Indian actress, dancer and television host. As an actress, she is best known for her work in Kannada television. After having made her debut in S. Narayan's Bhageerathi, she became recognized for her role as Bhavana in soap opera Guptagamini. An accomplished bharatanatyam dancer, she is recipient of the 1997 Aryabhata Award for Dance.

Biography 
Rao was born and raised in Koppa, a town in Chikmagalur district of India's Karnataka State. She graduated with a Bachelor of Science degree in computer science from KLE College and also holds a bachelor's degree in Hindi language that she obtained from the University of Madras. A trained Bharatanatyam dancer, Rao performed at events in New Delhi, Mumbai, Jaipur and Thiruvananthapuram and in the Hampi Utsav. She is a recipient of Karnataka State and Central scholarships (NCERT) in dance. She also won the Aryabhata award for dance in 1997.

Rao began her television career on being urged to try acting by actor Vijay Kashi. During this time, she was learning the Kuchipudi under Vyjayanthi Kashi. Rao made her television debut with S. Narayan's Bhageerathi in which she played Veena, the sister of Hema Prabhath's character. She then appeared in Swathi Muttu as Pallavi, in Bidige Chandrama as Shashikala, before starring in Yaava Janmada Maitri as Ananya in one of three roles, in Guptagamini as Bhavana, and in Sose Thanda Sowbhagya as Keerthi. Rao was awarded the Aryabhata Award for Acting in 2005, the Karnataka Television Association Award for Best Actress for her performance in Guptagamini and the Zee Kannada Best Actress Award for Sose Thanda Sowbhagya in 2012.

In 2020, Rao hosted the game show Genes that "showcase[d] family bonding" and invited television actors as participants.

Television

References

Indian television actresses
Indian women television presenters
Indian game show hosts
Indian female classical dancers
Performers of Indian classical dance
Living people
People from Chikkamagaluru district
Actresses from Karnataka
Actresses in Kannada television
Year of birth missing (living people)
21st-century Indian actresses